Nogarole Vicentino is a town and comune in the province of Vicenza, Veneto, Italy. It is east of SP43.

Sources

(Google Maps)

Cities and towns in Veneto